Robert William Chambers (May 26, 1865 – December 16, 1933) was an American artist and fiction writer, best known for his book of short stories titled The King in Yellow, published in 1895.

Life
Chambers was born in Brooklyn, New York, to William P. Chambers (1827–1911), a corporate and bankruptcy lawyer, and Caroline Smith Boughton (1842–1913). His parents met when his mother was twelve years old and William P. was interning with her father, Joseph Boughton, a prominent corporate lawyer. Eventually the two formed the law firm of Chambers and Boughton which continued to prosper even after Joseph's death in 1861. Robert Chambers's great-grandfather, William Chambers (birth unknown), a lieutenant in the British Royal Navy, was married to Amelia Saunders (1765–1822), a great granddaughter of Tobias Saunders of Westerly, Rhode Island. The couple moved from Westerly to Greenfield, Massachusetts and then to Galway, New York, where their son, also William Chambers (1798–1874), was born. The second William graduated from Union College at the age of 18, and then went to a college in Boston, where he studied medicine. Upon graduating, he and his wife, Eliza P. Allen (1793–1880), a direct descendant of Roger Williams, the founder of Providence, Rhode Island, were among the first settlers of Broadalbin, New York. His brother was the architect Walter Boughton Chambers.

Chambers was first educated at the Brooklyn Polytechnic Institute, and then entered the Art Students' League at around the age of twenty, where the artist Charles Dana Gibson was a fellow student. Chambers studied in Paris at the École des Beaux-Arts and the Académie Julian from 1886 to 1893, and his work was displayed at the Salon as early as 1889. On his return to New York, he succeeded in selling his illustrations to Life, Truth, and Vogue magazines. Then, for reasons unclear, he devoted his time to writing, producing his first novel, In the Quarter, written in 1887 in Munich. His most famous, and perhaps most meritorious, effort is The King in Yellow, a collection of Art Nouveau short stories published in 1895. This included several famous weird short stories which are connected by the theme of a fictitious drama of the same title, which drives those who read it insane. E. F. Bleiler described The King in Yellow as one of the most important works of American supernatural fiction. It was also strongly admired by H. P. Lovecraft and his circle.

Chambers returned to the weird genre in his later short story collections The Maker of Moons, The Mystery of Choice and The Tree of Heaven, but none earned him as much success as The King in Yellow. Some of Chambers's work contains elements of science fiction, such as In Search of the Unknown and Police!!!, about a zoologist who encounters monsters.

Chambers's main work of historical fiction was a series of novels set during the Franco-Prussian War. These novels were The Red Republic (1895, centring on the Paris Commune), Lorraine (1898),  Ashes of Empire (1898) and Maids of Paradise (1903). Chambers wrote Special Messenger (1909), Ailsa Paige (1910) and Whistling Cat (1932), novels set during the American Civil War. Chambers also wrote Cardigan (1901), a historical novel for younger readers, set at the outbreak of the American Revolution. Chambers later turned to writing romantic fiction to earn a living. According to some estimates, Chambers had one of the most successful literary careers of his period, his later novels selling well and a handful achieving best-seller status. Chambers' romance novels often featured intimate relationships between "caddish" men and sexually willing women, resulting in some reviewers accusing Chambers' works of promoting immorality. Many of his works were also serialised in magazines.

His novel The Man They Hanged was about Captain Kidd, and argued that Kidd was not a pirate but had been made a scapegoat by the British government.

During World War I, Chambers wrote war adventure novels and war stories, some of which showed a strong return to his old weird style, such as "Marooned" in Barbarians (1917). After 1924 he devoted himself solely to writing historical fiction.

Chambers for several years made Broadalbin, New York, his summer home. Some of his novels touch upon colonial life in Broadalbin and Johnstown.

On July 12, 1898, he married Elsa (Elsie) Vaughn Moller (1872–1939). They had a son, Robert Edward Stuart Chambers (1899–1955) (who sometimes used the name Robert Husted Chambers).

Robert W. Chambers died on December 16, 1933, after having undergone intestinal surgery three days earlier.

Criticism and legacy
H. P. Lovecraft said of Chambers in a letter to Clark Ashton Smith:

Despite Chambers's effective later abandonment of the weird supernatural tale, these early works are all that remained in print through most of the twentieth century, thanks to Lovecraft's inclusion of them in the critical study "Supernatural Horror in Literature".

Frederic Taber Cooper commented:

In an overview of Chambers' historical fiction, Wendy Bousfield stated that the historical novel Cardigan was "Chambers' most highly praised historical novel" during his lifetime. Bousfield also argued that much of Chambers' historical fiction was marred by poorly written characters and "insensitive humor at the expense of ethnic types". Bousfield also wrote that "Chambers' trivializing of human relationships is regrettable, since his recreation of period details of dress and daily life is vivid and historically accurate."

Critical studies of Chambers's horror and fantasy work include Lee Weinstein's essay in Supernatural Fiction Writers, Brian Stableford's essay in the
St. James Guide to Horror, Ghost and Gothic Writers and a chapter in S.T. Joshi's book The Evolution of the Weird Tale (2004).

Chambers's novel The Tracer of Lost Persons was adapted into a long-running (1937–54) radio crime drama, Mr. Keen, Tracer of Lost Persons, by soap opera producers Frank and Anne Hummert.

Chambers's The King in Yellow has inspired many modern authors, including Karl Edward Wagner, Joseph S. Pulver, Lin Carter, James Blish, Nic Pizzolatto, Michael Cisco, Stephen King, Ann K. Schwader, Robert M. Price, Galad Elflandsson and Charles Stross.

Bibliography

Novels and story collections

 In the Quarter (1894)
 The King in Yellow (1895) – short stories
 The Red Republic (1895)
 The Maker of Moons (1896) – short stories
 A King and A Few Dukes (1896)
 With the Band (1896)
 The Mystery of Choice (1897) – short stories
 Lorraine (1898)
 Ashes of Empire (1898)
 The Haunts of Men (1898) – short stories
 Outsiders (1899)
 The Cambric Mask (1899)
 The Conspirators (1899)
 Cardigan (1901)
 The Maid-at-Arms (1902)
 The Maids of Paradise (1903)
 In Search of the Unknown (1904)
 A Young Man in a Hurry (1904) – short stories
 The Reckoning (1905)
 Iole (1905)
 The Tracer of Lost Persons (1906)
 The Fighting Chance (1906)
 The Tree of Heaven (1907) – short stories
 The Younger Set (1907)
 Some Ladies in Haste (1908)
 The Firing Line (1908)
 Special Messenger (1909)
 The Danger Mark (1909)
 The Green Mouse (1910)
 Ailsa Paige (1910)
 The Common Law (1911)
 The Adventures of a Modest Man (1911)
 Blue-Bird Weather (1912)
 The Streets of Ascalon (1912)
 The Japonette (1912) – serialized in Cosmopolitan under the title The Turning Point
 The Gay Rebellion (1913)
 The Business of Life (1913)
 Quick Action (1914)
 The Hidden Children (1914)
 Anne's Bridge (1914)
 Between Friends (1914)
 Who Goes There! (1915)
 Athalie (1915)
 Police!!! (1915) – short stories
 The Girl Philippa (1916)
 The Better Man (1916) – short stories
 The Dark Star (1917)
 Barbarians (1917)
 The Laughing Girl (1918)
 The Restless Sex (1918)
 The Moonlit Way (1919)
 In Secret (1919)
 The Crimson Tide (1919)
 A Story of Primitive Love (1920)
 The Slayer of Souls (1920)
 The Little Red Foot (1920)
 Eris (1922)
 The Flaming Jewel (1922)
 The Talkers (1923)
 The Hi-Jackers (1923)
 America; or, The Sacrifice (1924)
 The Mystery Lady (1925)
 Marie Halkett (1925 UK, 1937 US)
 The Girl in Golden Rags (1925 UK, 1936 US)
 The Man They Hanged (1926)
 The Drums of Aulone (1927)
 The Gold Chase (1927)
 The Sun Hawk (1928)
 The Rogue's Moon (1928)
 The Happy Parrot (1929)
 The Painted Minx (1930)
 The Rake and the Hussy (1930)
 War Paint and Rouge (1931)
 Gitana (1931)
 Whistling Cat (1932)
 Whatever Love Is (1933)
 Secret Service Operator 13 (1934) – short stories published in Cosmopolitan between 1930 and 1932
 The Young Man's Girl (1934) – serialized in The Delineator, 1933
 Love and the Lieutenant (1935) – serialized in The Woman's Home Companion, 1934
 Beating Wings (1936) – serialized in McCall's, 1927
 The Fifth Horseman (1937) – serialized in McCall's, 1930
 Smoke of Battle (1938) – this novel was possibly finished by Rupert Hughes.

Children's books
 Outdoorland (1902) Illustrated by Reginald Bathurst Birch
 Orchard-Land (1903) Illustrated by Reginald Bathurst Birch
 River-Land (1904) Illustrated by Elizabeth S. Green
 Forest-Land (1905) Illustrated by Emily Benson Knipe
 Mountain-Land (1906) Illustrated by Frederick Richardson & Walter King Stone
 Garden-Land (1907) Illustrated by Harrison Cady
  The Happy Parrot (1931) Illustrated by Norman Price

Reprint collections
 The King in Yellow and Other Horror Stories, edited by E. F. Bleiler, Dover 1970
 The Yellow Sign and Other Stories, edited by S.T. Joshi, Chaosium 2004

Anthologies containing reprinted work by Robert W. Chambers

 Sporting Blood: The Great Sports Detective Stories, edited by Ellery Queen, Little, Brown and Company 1942 – contains "The Purple Emperor"
 Sleep No More, edited by August Derleth, Rinehart & Company 1944 – contains "The Yellow Sign"
 The Faded Banners, edited by Eric Solomon, T. Yoseloff 1960 – contains "Pickets"
 The Dark Descent, edited by David G. Hartwell, Tor 1987 – contains "The Repairer of Reputations"
 The Horror Hall of Fame, edited by Robert Silverberg and Martin H. Greenberg, Carroll & Graf 1991 – contains "The Yellow Sign"
 The Hastur Cycle, edited by Robert M. Price, Chaosium 1993 – contains "The Repairer of Reputations" and "The Yellow Sign"
 Detection by Gaslight, edited by Douglas G. Greene, Dover Publications 1997 – contains "The Purple Emperor"
 The Innsmouth Cycle, edited by Robert M. Price, Chaosium 1998 – contains "The Harbor-Master" (the first five chapters of In Search of the Unknown)
 American Supernatural Tales, edited by S. T. Joshi, Penguin Classics 2007 – contains "The Yellow Sign"
 The Tindalos Cycle, edited by Robert M. Price, Hippocampus Press 2010 – contains "The Maker of Moons"

Movies
 The Reckoning (1908), silent short film adaptation of novel. Directed by D. W. Griffith
 The Common Law (1916), silent film adaptation of novel. Directed by Albert Capellani
  (1916), silent film adaptation of novel.
 The Girl Philippa (1917), silent film adaptation of novel. Directed by S. Rankin Drew
 The Hidden Children (1917), silent film adaptation of novel. Directed by Oscar Apfel
 The Fettered Woman (1917), silent film adaptation of Anne's Bridge. Directed by Tom Terriss
  (1917), silent film adaptation of novel. Directed by William P. S. Earle
 The Woman Between Friends (1918), silent film adaptation of Between Friends. Directed by Tom Terriss
  (1918), silent film adaptation of novel. Directed by Tom Terriss
 The Danger Mark (1918), silent film adaptation of novel. Directed by Hugh Ford
 The Girl of Today (1918), silent film adaptation of short story. Directed by John S. Robertson
 The Cambric Mask (1919), silent film adaptation of novel. Directed by Tom Terriss
 The Firing Line (1919), silent film adaptation of novel. Directed by Charles Maigne
 The Dark Star (1919), silent film adaptation of novel. Directed by Allan Dwan
 The Black Secret (1919), silent film serial adaptation of In Secret. Directed by George B. Seitz
 Even as Eve (1920), silent film adaptation of short story "The Shining Band". Directed by Chester De Vonde and B. A. Rolfe
 The Turning Point (1920), silent film adaptation of The Japonette. Directed by J. A. Barry
 The Fighting Chance (1920), silent film adaptation of novel. Directed by Charles Maigne
 The Restless Sex (1920), silent film adaptation of novel. Directed by Leon D'Usseau and Robert Z. Leonard
 Unseen Forces (1920), silent film adaptation of Athalie. Directed by Sidney A. Franklin
 Cardigan (1922), silent film adaptation of novel. Screenplay by Chambers. Directed by John W. Noble
 The Common Law (1923), silent film adaptation of novel. Directed by George Archainbaud
 America (1924), silent film adaptation of The Reckoning. Screenplay by Chambers. Directed by D. W. Griffith
 Between Friends (1924), silent film adaptation of novel. Directed by J. Stuart Blackton
 The Common Law (1931), film adaptation of novel. Directed by Paul L. Stein
 Operator 13 (1934), film adaptation of short stories from Secret Service Operator 13. Directed by Richard Boleslawski
 A Time Out of War (1954), short film adaptation of short story "Pickets". Directed by Denis Sanders
 The Yellow Sign (2001), film adaptation of short story. Directed by Aaron Vanek

Notes

References

External links

 
 
 
 
 
 
 
 
 
 Operator 13 Manuscript at Dartmouth College Library

1865 births
1933 deaths
19th-century American novelists
20th-century American novelists
Académie Julian alumni
American alumni of the École des Beaux-Arts
American fantasy writers
American historical novelists
Writers of historical fiction set in the early modern period
Writers of historical fiction set in the modern age
American horror writers
American illustrators
American science fiction writers
Mythopoeic writers
Writers from Brooklyn
People from Broadalbin, New York
American male novelists
American male short story writers
19th-century American short story writers
Novelists from New York (state)
Weird fiction writers
20th-century American male writers
Members of the American Academy of Arts and Letters